The blackhand sole (Pegusa nasuta) is a fish species in the family Soleidae, common in the Mediterranean Sea, the Black Sea, and the Sea of Azov. It was considered a subspecies of the sand sole in past, as Pegusa lascaris nasuta. Therefore,  it is sometimes mistakenly mentioned for the Black Sea fauna as Pegusa lascaris. Marine subtropical demersal fish, up to 17 cm long.

References 

Pegusa
Fish described in 1814
Fish of the Mediterranean Sea
Fish of the Adriatic Sea
Fish of the Black Sea
Fish of Europe